Andhra Pradesh Metro Rail Corporation (APMRC) is a State Public Sector company that operates Visakhapatnam Metro and Vijayawada Metro. At first AMRC was incorporated as Amaravati Metro Rail Corporation - a Special Purpose Vehicle (SPV) for the implementation of the Vijayawada Metro Rail project, later Visakhapatnam Metro Rail Project was added to the list. It was first proposed as a Mass Rapid Transit System in VGTM UDA which was later changed into AMRDA.

History 

AP Metro Rail Corporation was created on 29 October 2015 with N. P. Ramakrishna Reddy, managing director, as its first managing director. This project was first taken up as a Medium Metro rail project, designed by DMRC. It was rejected by the government of India due to financial issues. The Government of Andhra Pradesh opted for Light Metro rail which was heavily opposed by E. Sreedharan, who was serving as an advisor for the government regarding both metro projects as Light Metro may not serve the needs of the capital city Amaravati, which revoked the MOU between AMRC and DMRC. Since the government refused to build them, Andhra Pradesh government opted to take this project with financial support from some companies in Korea and Malaysia.

Projects

Visakhapatnam Metro 
Initially proposed for Metro Rail alignment for a length of 42.55 km in the city. Government have planned to expand the Metro Rail system to cover more routes in the city as well as in the VMRDA (Visakhapatnam Metropolitan Regional Development Authority) area.

Accordingly, a Detailed Project Report is under preparation for 79.9 km length of Light Metro Rail system and for 60.2 km length of modern Catenary Free Tram system. The proposed Light Metro Rail corridors are

(i) Kommadi to Steel Plant Jn. on NH-16 (34.23 km)

(ii) Gurudwara to Old Post Office (5.26 km)

(iii) Thatichetlapalem to Chinavalteru (RK Beach) (6.91 km)

(iv) Law college Jn. to Marikivalasa (8.21 km)

(v) Kommadi to Bhogapuram Airport (25.3 km) and

The Modern Tram Ways are

(i) Old Post Office to Rusikonda Beach (15.40 km)

(ii) NAD Jn. to Pendurthi (10.2 km)

(iii) Steel plant Jn. to Anakapalli (18.2 km)

(iv) Rusikonda Beach to Bheemili Beach (16.4 km)

Vijayawada Metro 

See also 

Andhra Pradesh

References

Rapid transit companies of India
Railway companies established in 2015
Companies based in Andhra Pradesh
Indian companies established in 2015
Rail transport in Andhra Pradesh
2015 establishments in Andhra Pradesh